Carwynnen is a hamlet in Cornwall, England. Carwynnen consists of only 7 dwellings.

Carwynnen was part of the Pendarves Estate which lay between Troon and the Camborne parish boundary with Crowan, at the River Connor that runs through Carwynnen. Nearby is Carwynnen Quoit.

References

Hamlets in Cornwall